The List of piers in the United States is naming piers in the United States, by state.

List

Alabama

California

Florida

Illinois

Maine

Massachusetts

New Jersey

New York

North Carolina

South Carolina

Virginia

Virgin Islands

Washington

See also 
 List of piers

External links 
 California Pier Statistics

Piers
Piers